Tony Klimek (November 24, 1925 – August 21, 2012) was an American football defensive end. He played for the Chicago Cardinals from 1951 to 1952.

He died on August 21, 2012, in Chicago, Illinois at age 86.

References

1925 births
2012 deaths
Players of American football from Chicago
American football defensive ends
Illinois Fighting Illini football players
Chicago Cardinals players